Walnut Street School may refer to:

in the United States
 Walnut Street School (Woodland, California), listed on the NRHP in California
 Walnut Street School (Evansville, Indiana), listed on the NRHP in Indiana
 Walnut Street School (Reading, Massachusetts), listed on the NRHP in Massachusetts
 Walnut Street School (Wooster, Ohio), listed on the NRHP in Ohio